Dean Potter (born 2 May 1970) is a New Zealand former cricketer. He played first-class and List A cricket for Northern Districts and List A cricket Auckland between 1991 and 1998.

See also
 List of Auckland representative cricketers

References

External links
 

1970 births
Living people
New Zealand cricketers
Auckland cricketers
Northern Districts cricketers
People from Waiuku